The 1996 United States presidential election in Minnesota took place on November 5, 1996, as part of the 1996 United States presidential election. Voters chose ten representatives, or electors to the Electoral College, who voted for president and vice president.

A Democratic-leaning state, Minnesota was comfortably won by incumbent Democratic President Bill Clinton. Clinton took 51.10% of the popular vote over Republican challenger Bob Dole, who took 34.96%, a victory margin of 16.14%. Reform Party candidate Ross Perot finished in third, with 11.75% of the popular vote.

, and despite the state’s long Democratic streak – having not voted Republican since 1972 – this is the most recent election that the Republican candidate received less than forty percent of the vote in a presidential election, the most recent in which a Democrat would win the state by more than 15% of the vote, the most recent in which the Democratic candidate won more counties than the Republican, and the most recent when Anoka, Becker, Benton, Cass, Chisago, Clearwater, Cottonwood, Crow Wing, Dodge, Faribault, Goodhue, Hubbard, Isanti, Jackson, Kanabec, Kandiyohi, Lake of the Woods, Le Sueur, Lyon, Martin, McLeod, Meeker, Mille Lacs, Morrison, Nobles, Renville, Scott, Sherburne, Sibley, Stearns, Steele, Todd, Wabasha, Waseca, and Wright Counties voted for a Democratic presidential candidate. This is the only time since 1952 that Martin County voted for a Democratic presidential candidate.

Results

Results by county

See also
 United States presidential elections in Minnesota

References

Minnesota
1996
1996 Minnesota elections